Taimi is a social networking and dating app that caters to LGBTQI+ people. The network matches internet users based on their selected preferences and location. Taimi runs on iOS and Android.

The mobile application has a free and subscription-based premium version. Taimi started out as an online dating application for gay men. However, the company announced several times plans for LGBTQI+ inclusive version in the past.

Taimi currently provides social networking and dating services to LGBTQ+ people, including livestreaming, video calling and chatting.

Taimi is available in 45 countries including the United States, Canada, Italy, Australia, Singapore, and Brazil.

History 

Taimi was launched in 2017 by Social Impact Inc. in Las Vegas. Taimi's founder Alex Pasykov came up with a name for the dating app “Tame Me” which gradually morphed into Taimi.

The company has expanded to several countries in Europe. On October 31, 2018, Taimi announced the launch in the United Kingdom. On July 20, 2019, Taimi launched in the Netherlands, Spain and countries in Central America followed.

In 2020, after BlueCity went public with Blued, Pasykov hinted at the possibility of Taimi's future IPO.

Pasykov describes himself as an ally and stated in an open letter that Taimi would partner with NGOs to fight state-sponsored homophobia around the world.

The company has been a sponsor of several Pride marches and parades including Los Angeles Pride, New York City Pride, Las Vegas Pride. Taimi also partnered up with the Trevor Project to support LGBTQI+ rights. During COVID-19 pandemic Taimi partnered with Attitude Magazine for virtual pride.

Operation

Features 

Taimi claims to be "the safest gay dating" app with a focus on security features like two-factor authentication and automated account verification. The founder has described the app's development as "user-driven".

In 2018 the app was met with a negative response from LGBTQI+ activists when Taimi implemented a filter that allowed Taimi users to block each other based on HIV status. Taimi removed the filter and that option is no longer available.

In 2020, Taimi launched new features including Rainbow Like and Live Streams. The latter were introduced during a livestreaming event, Taimi Talks.

In November 2020 the app underwent a full redesign, incorporating a new logo, new branding, and an upgraded app interface.

References

Further reading 

Imagining Interventions for Collective Sex Environments, Flowers, P. & Frankis, J. Arch Sex Behav (2019) 48: 35. Imagining Interventions for Collective Sex Environments | SpringerLink
Smartphone Battery Levels and Sexual Decision-Making Among Men Who Have Sex with Men, Lopes, A., Skoda, K. & Pedersen, C.L. Sexuality & Culture (2019).

External links

Mobile applications
Online dating services of the United States
Online dating applications
Same sex online dating
LGBT social networking services